Logan Emory (born January 10, 1988) is an American soccer player who last played for LA Galaxy II in the USL Pro. He is currently an assistant coach at the University of Portland.

Career

Youth and amateur
Emory attended Centennial High School, was named the Idaho Men's Gatorade Player of the Year in 2005, played club soccer for the Boise Nationals, and was part of his region's Olympic Development Program, before going on to play college soccer at the University of Portland. With the Pilots he was named to the All-West Coast Conference Freshman Team in 2006, and was an All-WCC Honorable Mention as a junior and a senior in 2008 and 2009.

During his college years Emory also played for the Spokane Spiders and Portland Timbers U23s in the USL Premier Development League.

Professional
Emory turned professional in 2010 when he signed with the Puerto Rico Islanders of the USSF Division 2 Professional League.

He made his professional debut on April 16, 2010, in a 2010 CFU Club Championship game against Haitian side Racing des Gonaïves, and made his league debut on April 21, 2010, in a game against NSC Minnesota Stars.

Emory signed with Toronto FC on March 13, 2012. He made his MLS debut against the Seattle Sounders FC on March 17, 2012. He was waived by Toronto FC on June 27, 2013.

Honors
Puerto Rico Islanders
 USSF Division 2 Pro League: 2010
 CFU Club Championship: 2010
 CFU Club Championship:2011
 North American Soccer League: Semi-finalists 2011

Toronto FC
 Canadian Championship: 2012

References

External links

Portland Pilots bio

1988 births
Living people
American soccer players
American expatriate soccer players
Portland Pilots men's soccer players
Spokane Spiders players
Portland Timbers U23s players
Puerto Rico Islanders players
Toronto FC players
San Antonio Scorpions players
LA Galaxy II players
Expatriate footballers in Puerto Rico
Expatriate soccer players in Canada
USL League Two players
USSF Division 2 Professional League players
North American Soccer League players
Major League Soccer players
USL Championship players
Soccer players from Idaho
Association football defenders